John Sims may refer to:

John Sims (taxonomist) (1749-1831), physician and botanist
John Sims (footballer), English former professional footballer
John Joseph Sims, English recipient of the Victoria Cross

See also
John Simms (disambiguation)
John Sim (disambiguation)